Abraham of Cratia or Krateia ( 474 –  558) was a Christian monk from Emesa (now Homs) Byzantine Syria. He is recognized as a saint in the Christian church, with a feast day of 6 December.

He was born at Emesa in Byzantine Syria. The community there was dispersed shortly later by nomadic raiders. Abraham himself fled to Constantinople. When he was only 26 years old, he was made the abbot of the monastery of Cratia in Bithynia. Some ten years later, he secretly left for Palestine seeking a quieter life. He was subsequently made to return to his monastery, where he also was shortly thereafter made the local bishop of Cratia. He served as a bishop for 13 years before he retired about 525, and again left for Palestine, and remained there for the rest of his life, living a life of religious contemplation and having becοme a hermit. He lived in a monastery at the Tower of Eudokia. He died on 6 December, which would later be his feast day.

References

External sources
Attwater, Donald and Catherine Rachel John. The Penguin Dictionary of Saints. 3rd edition. New York: Penguin Books, 1993. .
Holweck, F. G., A Biographical Dictionary of the Saints. St. Louis, MO: B. Herder Book Co. 1924.
Matthew Bunson, "Encyclopedia of Saints, Second Edition", Publisher: Our Sunday Visitor; 2nd ed. edition (July 2, 2014), 1056 pages, .
John J. Delaney, "Dictionary of Saints", Publisher: Image; 2nd ed. edition (March 15, 2005), 720 pages, 
Ramsgate Benedictine Monks of St.Augustine's Abbey (Author), "The Book of Saints (Reference)", Publisher: A & C Black Publishers Ltd; 7th edition (May 31, 2002), 655 pages, 

474 births
558 deaths
6th-century Syrian bishops
Byzantine abbots
Byzantine saints
6th-century Christian saints